St. Dorothy School is a Catholic school on the South side of Chicago, Illinois in the United States. St. Dorothy School is part of the Roman Catholic Archdiocese of Chicago.  It was founded in 1916 by Archbishop George Mundelein, and Rev. John Scanlan was the first acting priest.

Church background
St. Dorothy School is named after Dorothea of Caesarea.

History
In July 1916, Archbishop George Mundelem helped Rev. John Scanlan to make a Southside church dedicated to Dorothea of Caesarea.  On July 16, 1916 the first mass was held at 811 East 75 street.  On April 15, 1917 St. Dorothy's church and school building were complete and the first mass at the new church was November 18, 1917.  St. Dorothy's school opened up to the neighborhood on May 12, 1918.  Later, the Chatham area filled up with immigrants and in July 1925 the second pastor Father Thomas Sheridan added the second floor to the school building.  The third pastor, Father Joseph Connelly who finance to get a better school building.

In the 1950s-1960s, the neighborhood changed from ethnic white to African American.  In April 1972, Father Micheal Nallen was the fourth pastor and been there since 1970.  In 1982, Sir Catherine Wingert PBVM was the principal of St. Dorothy's school.  In 1997, Ms. JoAnne Yerkes was the principal for 5 years.  Since 2002, Mr. Robert Zeegers has been the principal of St. Dorothy's school.  The priest of St. Dorothy's church is Father Bob who has been at St. Dorothy's for 4 years.

Academics
St. Dorothy's academics are challenging to students on many different levels. There are different teachers for different subjects. Some teachers have two or more subjects to teach. For example, Peter Nelson he is our main history teacher, but he also teaches English & Religion. The junior high classes switch throughout the day to classes, whether it is Gym or History.  All of the primary grades (Pre-K through 4th) do not switch until they get into the fifth grade.  As the school year goes on the academic challengements increase, and if they do not feel like they are ready or do not understand the lesson, they could always raise their hand and the teacher will go deeper into the lesson.

Clubs and activities
Jazz band started in late October 2010.  The band has over 20 members and they all play different instruments. The band was founded by Mr. Zeegers, and the instructor is Mr. Danosine.
Liturgical Dancers are currently led by Mrs. Jeter and Ms. Richie.  There are about 64 members on the St. Dorothy's Liturgical dance team.  The dancers perform every Tuesday at St. Dorothy's School Mass.
The Flag Football team started in the first week of September 2010.  The coaches are Edmund Dixon and Mr. Nelson.  During their first year of playing flag football, the team won 1 game and lost 7.

Sports
St. Dorothy students are filled with great talents, One of the School Talents is being able to play sports. A sport that St. Dorothy is most talented in is Basketball. The team is pretty good, but it needs more work to win a championship. Another sport that St. Dorothy just added is Flag Football. Flag football is really hard, well not if you know the game.

Most of the coaches at St. Dorothy's run by traditions, and some coaches are graduates of St. Dorothy School. The coaches inspire the players to do better and they also teach the players how to play the game. St. Dorothy's Flag Football team was founded in 2010, by the Head Coach, Edmund Dixon, and the Assistant Coach, Peter Nelson. Though the Flag Football team one-and-seven but it still was a good start.

One huge great talent St. Dorothy has is the love for sports. Over the years St. Dorothy has had all different types of sports. St. Dorothy has had a Cheerleading Drill Team, Basketball Team, Volleyball Team and a Flag Football Team. The Seasons for Basketball, and Flag Football are over. St. Dorothy's 7th and 8th grade Basketball Team did wonderful this year.

For their regular season they won 9 games and lost 6. Go Defenders. During the playoffs they won 10 games and lost 6. Overall the 7th grade boys thought this year could've been better, and more defensive plays, and just nice. The Flag Football team was new but they tried. They won 1 game and lost 1.

Technology
Sister Lou controls the computers and updates them and she teaches others how to type and there are computer games to help the kids at St. Dorothy School, but mainly math game such as jiji.  Jiji challenges the kids at St. Dorothy School. St. Dorothy School has a computer lab and has plenty of laptops, 34 desktops, and 68 laptop but more are coming soon.  Sister Lou teaches kids how to properly use a computer and all the computer are up to date.

Current faculty and staff

Principal - Mr. Robert Anderson 
Mr. Robert Anderson will start as our principal in the fall, at the beginning of the 2012-2013 school year. He has been involved with the school before, teaching gym, and coaching basketball. He will replace Mr. Robert Zeegers, the principal for 11 years.

Assistant Principal - Mrs. Shauna Winston 
Mrs. Winston has many roles in St. Dorothy School. Her main role is being our Assistant Principal. She also teaches math to grades 5-8, and is the homeroom teacher for the eighth grade. Her students refer to her as the best teacher in the world. She is a strong disciplinarian. She takes pride in doing men.

Pre-K - Ms. Vences, Ms. Richie, & Ms. Patton 
There are Pre Kindergarten grades with two different classrooms. One for 3 year olds and one for 4 year olds. Most people might say that they are very advanced for their age, but that is all thanks to our 3 Pre-K teachers. Ms. Patton has been here at St. Dorothy since the fall of 2009. But Ms. Vences has been here for a long number of years. All of the Pre-K Teachers feel that St. Dorothy gives them a great support.

Kindergarten - Ms. Diane Richie & Mrs. Denise Maggit 
Ms. Richie & Ms. Maggit are in charge of the kindergarten. They are excellent teachers. They love the school and feel that it is an enjoyable place to be .

Improvements
In order to improve the school St. Dorothy's would like to set up a student government for next school year.  The school would also like to have more girls willing to start a basketball team.  In the after school, St. Dorothy's would like to maintain the jazz ensemble and drumming.  Papa C will be coming back for art this upcoming year.

Fundraisers
Saint Dorothy has four fundraisers.  The World's Finest Chocolate fundraiser is an annual event which begins at the beginning of the year.  The Rice Bowl Fundraiser is also an annual event.  It helps people who are in need near and a far. The cookie dough and Walk - A - Thon began this year.  The fundraisers helps pay off tuition for the students.  Fundraisers also helps to increase enrollment.

References

External links
St. Dorothy School

Catholic elementary schools in Illinois
Private elementary schools in Chicago
Catholic schools in Chicago
Private middle schools in Chicago
Educational institutions established in 1918